Ash Manor School is a comprehensive, community secondary school located in Manor Road, Ash, Surrey, England. Opened as Yeoman's Bridge School in 1948. The school was formed after a merger between two schools Yeomans Bridge and Robert Haining in 1986. There are 937 students.

Standards
During the last full inspection carried out by Ofsted at the school in December 2012, the inspectors judged the school to be Good.  This grade was upheld in an Ofsted short inspection in March 2017.

House system 

Ash Manor is divided into four Houses. Each are known for their strong individual characteristics and competitiveness in sport. While the House colours have remained unchanged, the names of the Houses were originally the surnames of famous people from British History, they were: Brunel, Faraday, Wells and Newton. The current names were picked via democratic vote by the students within each house and are:

  Phoenix
  Sparta
  Galileo
  Venture

Previously, Year 7 had their own house, called Darwin, but this has since been merged back into the other houses. The house colour was gold and pupils were given matching gold house ties.

Former pupils
 Peter Storey, former Arsenal and England football player
 Stephanie Twell, middle-distance runner who competed in the 2008 Summer Olympics and 2020 Summer Olympics.
 James Wade, champion darts player

References

External links
Ash Manor School Website
Ash Manor School on Dcsf Website

Community schools in Surrey
Secondary schools in Surrey